Šimon Mičuda (born 28 January 2004) is a Slovak professional footballer who plays as a right-back for Fortuna Liga club AS Trenčín.

Club career

AS Trenčín
Mičuda made his Fortuna Liga debut for AS Trenčín in an away fixture against Skalica on 30 July 2022.

International career
Mičuda was first recognised in Slovak senior national team nomination in premier nomination by Francesco Calzona in September 2022 being listed as a replacement for 2022–23 UEFA Nations League fixtures, repeating the recognition in same position ahead of November friendlies. Previously to these autumn recognitions, Mičuda had never been considered in the U21 team, not even as an alternate. He failed to penetrate into the shortlisted nomination for prospective national team players' training camp at NTC Senec in December, remaining in the role of an alternate. Mičuda was one of the players of whom former international Ján Mucha spoke with surprise and hints of criticism toward Calzona, concerning his recognition in November nomination.

References

External links
 AS Trenčín official club profile 
 Futbalnet profile 
 
 

2004 births
Living people
People from Ilava
Sportspeople from the Trenčín Region
Slovak footballers
Slovakia youth international footballers
Association football defenders
AS Trenčín players
Slovak Super Liga players